CUE Bus (City-University-Energysaver) is a bus service operated by the City of Fairfax, Virginia, and is completely separate from the Fairfax Connector bus service run by Fairfax County.

Routes and services 
CUE operates two loop routes between George Mason University and the Vienna Metro station, each running in both directions for a total of four named routes. The Green loop, consisting of routes Green 1 (clockwise) and Green 2 (counterclockwise) operates on the east side of Fairfax, while the Gold loop, consisting of routes Gold 1 (clockwise) and Gold 2 (counterclockwise) operates on the west side.

In addition to providing service to GMU and Vienna Metro, the CUE serves all major activity centers in the City of Fairfax, including downtown, Kamp Washington, Old Town Fairfax, Fairfax Circle and Fair City Mall.

In 2009, the City of Fairfax partnered with Montgomery County, Maryland, in the purchase of new buses.  As a result, six 35-foot, low-floor Gillig Hybrid buses were added to the fleet in August 2009.  These new buses are expected to consume much less fuel, as they operate off an electric engine when operated at 35 MPH or lower, and 35 MPH is the maximum speed limit in Fairfax.  These buses are now retired as of May 2022.

The CUE Bus system owns and operates twelve 35-foot, low-floor Gillig clean diesel buses in its fleet, half of which replaced the remaining 30-foot Gillig Phantom buses in the fall of 2015, the other half entered service and replaced the hybrid buses in May 2022.

Zero-Fare Pilot 
In 2020 CUE stopped collecting fares to reduce passenger contact during the COVID-19 pandemic and remained zero-fare after that point. In January, 2022 the City Council approved a plan to formalize a 3-year zero-fare pilot program that would make CUE free to ride through June, 2025. In Spring of 2022 CUE was awarded a Transit Ridership Incentive Program grant from the Virginia Department of Rail and Public Transportation that allowed the City to extend the pilot program for an additional year, making CUE free to ride through June, 2026.

Fleet

Retired fleet

References

External links 
 

Bus transportation in Virginia
Fairfax, Virginia